Mikhail Ivanovich Terebenyov (6 September 1795 – 25 December 1864) was a Russian portrait painter, academician of the Imperial Academy of Arts.

Biography
Mikhail Terebenyov was born in Saint Petersburg in 1795. His father Ivan Efimovich Terebenyov (1759–1799) was an artist who graduated from the Academy of Arts in 1779, his brother Ivan (1780–1815) was a sculptor, painter and graphic artist, another brother Vladimir (1808–1876) was an artist and lithographer.

In 1803, he entered the Imperial Academy of Arts.

The artist died in Saint Petersburg on December 25, 1864.

Gallery

External links
 Benezit Dictionary of Artist
 Terebenev Mikhail Ivanovich

19th-century painters from the Russian Empire
Russian portrait painters
1795 births
1864 deaths